Angulaticeras is an extinct genus of cephalopod belonging to the ammonite subclass.

References

Jurassic ammonites of Europe
Schlotheimiidae
Ammonitida genera